Pigment Orange 13 is an organic compound and an azo compound.  It is a commercial orange pigment.  It is also classified as a diarylide pigment, being derived from 3,3'-dichlorobenzidine.  It is closely related to Pigment Orange 3, wherein the two phenyl groups are replaced by p-tolyl groups.

References

Pigments
Organic pigments
Shades of orange
Diarylide pigments